Broadwell is an unincorporated community in Harrison County, Kentucky, United States.

References

Unincorporated communities in Harrison County, Kentucky
Unincorporated communities in Kentucky